The New Taipei Municipal Yingge Vocational High School (YKVS) is a professional school located in Yingge District, New Taipei, Taiwan. It was founded in 1997. As of 2021 the principal was Long-Yuan, Yan.

School history 

The construction of the administration and teaching buildings began in March 1994. By July 1994, the Planning, Preparation and Consulting Committee was established to begin strategic planning for the school.

The Preparation Department was formally established in July 1996. Lin was assigned as director, focused on establishing the school system.

By June 1997, New Taipei City Government granted Lin formal approval. On August 1, 1997, the Ceramic Engineering, Fine Art and Crafts, Advertising Design, and Data Processing departments were approved and 4 classes were added. By December 8, 1997, 14 more classes were added.

On December 24, 1999, the Information department and related classes were approved and established.

By 2010, a General Class for sports was added.

See also
 Education in Taiwan

External links 

 New Taipei Municipal Yingge Vocational  High School website
 New Taipei Municipal Yingge Vocational  High School Introduction.pdf
 

1997 establishments in Taiwan
Educational institutions established in 1997
High schools in Taiwan
Schools in New Taipei